Acacia hippuroides is a shrub belonging to the genus Acacia and the subgenus Lycopodiifoliae that is endemic to north western Australia

Description
Like most species of Acacia it has phyllodes rather than true leaves. The phyllodes occur in whorls containing 12 to 15 individual phyllodes. It blooms from March to October and produces yellow flowers. The obloid to spherical flower-heads contain 30 to 40 flowers. After flowering crustaceous to coriaceous seed pods for that have a broadly linear shape and are more or less flat and curved.

Taxonomy
The species was first formally described by Robert Heward and George Bentham in 1842 as a part of William Jackson Hookers work Notes on Mimoseae, with a synopsis of species as published in the London Journal of Botany. It was reclassified as Racosperma hippuroides by Leslie Pedley in 2003 then transferred back to genus Acacia in 2006.

Distribution
It is native to an area in the Kimberley region of Western Australia where it is commonly situated on undulating plains, rocky hills and ranges where it grows in red sandy or skeletal soils over quartzite or sandstone. The bulk of the population is found in coastal areas of the west Kimberley from around the Dampier Peninsula, on the Buccaneer and Bonaparte Archipelagoes in the north down to around Thangoo Station in the south where it is usually part of in woodland and shrubland communities sometimes in seepage areas.

See also
List of Acacia species

References

hippuroides
Acacias of Western Australia
Taxa named by George Bentham
Plants described in 1842